A constitutional referendum was held in France on 13 October 1946. Voters were asked whether they approved of a new constitution proposed by the Constituent Assembly elected in June. Unlike the May referendum, which saw a previous constitutional proposal rejected, the new Constitution of 27 October 1946 was accepted by 53.2% of voters, and brought the Fourth Republic into existence. Voter turnout was 67.6%.

Results

See also
 October 1946 French constitutional referendum in Algeria
 October 1946 French constitutional referendum in Cameroon
 October 1946 French constitutional referendum in Dahomey and Togo
 October 1946 French constitutional referendum in Chad–Ubangi-Shari
 October 1946 French constitutional referendum in French Somaliland
 October 1946 French constitutional referendum in French Sudan−Niger
 October 1946 French constitutional referendum in Gabon–Moyen Congo
 October 1946 French constitutional referendum in Guinea
 October 1946 French constitutional referendum in Ivory Coast
 October 1946 French constitutional referendum in Mauritania−Senegal
 October 1946 French constitutional referendum in Tunisia

References

1946 10
1946 elections in France
France
October 1946 events in Europe
1946 10